Blagoje Tamindžić (born April 8, 1952) is a retired soccer goalkeeper.

Club career
He was nicknamed Baja, which was also his kit name in one season, as well as Blaggy.

Serbian White Eagles 
Tamindžić played in abroad in the National Soccer League in 1973 with the Serbian White Eagles where in his debut season was named the league's top goalkeeper. He returned to the Serbs the following season where once more he was named the top goalkeeper. Throughout the regular season, he helped the White Eagles win the regular season title. He also helped the club secure the Canadian Open Cup which granted the Serbs a spot in the CONCACAF Champions' Cup.

Rochester Lancers 
In 1976, he joined former head coach Don Popovic south of the border to play in the North American Soccer League with Rochester Lancers. In his debut season in the NASL, he finished the season with a 1.28 goals-against average placing him tenth in the overall goalkeeping stats. He also helped the Lancers secure a playoff berth and played in the opening round of the competition where Rochester was eliminated to Toronto Metros-Croatia. Tamindžić departed from Rochester following the conclusion of the season.

Montreal Castors 
In 1977, he returned to the National Soccer League to sign with Montreal Castors. In late 1977, Tamindžić along with six Montreal players were traded to the Ottawa Tigers in order to assist in their playoff match against Toronto Croatia to gain promotion to the NSL First Division. The transaction provided Montreal with the bargaining rights to Mick Jones. He re-signed with Montreal for the 1978 NSL season.

Toronto Blizzard  
He returned to the national NASL in 1979 to sign with the Toronto Blizzard. After the conclusion of the 1982 season, he was transferred to Phoenix Inferno of the Major Indoor Soccer League.

Later career 
In 1983, he played with the Toronto Nationals of the Canadian Professional Soccer League. In the winter of 1984, he returned to the indoor level to play with Chicago Sting.

References

1952 births
Living people
People from Bileća
Serbs of Bosnia and Herzegovina
Canadian people of Serbian descent
Yugoslav emigrants to Canada
Bosnia and Herzegovina emigrants to Canada
Naturalized citizens of Canada
Association football goalkeepers
Bosnia and Herzegovina footballers
Yugoslav footballers
Canadian soccer players
Serbian White Eagles FC players
Rochester Lancers (1967–1980) players
Montreal Castors players
Toronto Blizzard (1971–1984) players
Phoenix Inferno players
Toronto Nationals (soccer) players
Chicago Sting (MISL) players
Canadian National Soccer League players
North American Soccer League (1968–1984) players
North American Soccer League (1968–1984) indoor players
Major Indoor Soccer League (1978–1992) players
Canadian expatriate soccer players
Expatriate soccer players in the United States
Canadian expatriate sportspeople in the United States
Canadian Professional Soccer League (original) players